Ninon Colneric (born 1948) is the first female German judge at the European Court of Justice (2000-2006).

Career 
Born in Oer-Erkenschwick, she studied legal science in Tübingen, Munich and Geneva. Following a period of academic research in London, she was awarded a doctorate in law by the University of Munich. She was authorised, by the University of Bremen, to teach labour law, sociology of law and social law. She was professor ad interim at the faculty of law of the universities of Frankfurt, and Bremen. She was a judge at the Labour Court (Arbeitsgericht) Oldenburg (1986-1989). She was president of the Landesarbeitsgericht Schleswig-Holstein (1989-2000). She collaborated, as an expert, on the European Expertise Service (European Union) project for the reform of the labour law of Kirghizstan (1994 to 1995). She was an honorary Professor at the University of Bremen in labour law, specifically in European labour law. 

From 2000 until 2006 she was the first female German judge at the European Court of Justice. From 2008 until 2011 she became Co-Dean at the China-EU School of Law, a cooperative project between a consortium of European universities and the China University of Political Science and Law.

Since 2018 she is member of the Whistleblower-Netzwerk e.V., and since 2020 a member of the advisory board of the Institute for Secular Law.

See also

List of members of the European Court of Justice

References 

Colneric, Ninon
Colneric, Ninon
Colneric, Ninon
Colneric, Ninon
Academic staff of the Ludwig Maximilian University of Munich
Legal educators
German women academics
Labour law scholars
German judges of international courts and tribunals
Women legal scholars